Naver VIBE (Hangul:네이버 바이브) is a music streaming service developed by Naver Corporation. The service was operated alongside Naver's other music service, Naver Music, until the service ended on November 1, 2020 and merged with VIBE. Naver also operates another music service under its Japanese subsidiary, Line Corporation, called Line Music. It is the fifth largest music streaming service in South Korea.

Overview 
Unlike Naver's other music service, VIBE relies on artificial intelligence to curate music and recommend songs based on what users listen to based on the sound of the music rather than what's popular on charts like Naver Music. VIBE also introduced a new payment system where users pay for songs they listen to rather than paying a monthly fee. It also revamped the way it compensated artists by adopting a similar payment model used by Spotify and Apple Music where they are paid proportionally to their streaming volume of music.

See also
 Line Music
 Melon (online music service)

References

Music streaming services
IOS software
Android (operating system) software
Internet properties established in 2018